William Finney (13 August 1866 – 8 May 1927) was a Welsh cricketer. Finney was a right-handed batsman who bowled both right-arm slow and right-arm medium-fast. He was born at Newtown, Montgomeryshire.

Finney made his first-class debut for Leicestershire in the counties' inaugural first-class fixture against Essex in 1894 at the County Ground, Leyton. He made two further first-class appearances for Leicestershire in 1894, against Yorkshire and the Marylebone Cricket Club. In his three matches, he scored a total of 29 runs at an average of 7.25, with a high score of 14 not out, while with the ball he took a single wicket.

He died at Stamford, Lincolnshire on 8 May 1927.

References

External links
William Finney at ESPNcricinfo
William Finney at CricketArchive

1866 births
1927 deaths
People from Newtown, Powys
Sportspeople from Powys
Welsh cricketers
Leicestershire cricketers